The 1972 Sandown 250 was an endurance motor race for Group E Series Production Touring Cars.  It was held on 10 September 1972 over 130 laps of the Sandown circuit in Victoria, Australia, a total distance of 250 miles (403 km). The race was Heat 2 of the 1972 Australian Manufacturers' Championship.

The race was own by John Goss driving a Ford XY Falcon GTHO Phase III.

Class Structure
As a heat of the 1972 Australian Manufacturers' Championship, the race featured four classes defined by "Capacity Price Units".
The CP Unit value for each car was assessed by multiplying the engine capacity (in litres) by the Sydney retail price (in Australian dollars).
 Class A : Up to 3,000 CP Units
 Class B : 3,001 to 9,000 CP Units
 Class C : 9,001 to 18,000 CP Units
 Class D : Over 18,000 CP Units

Results

Note: Of the 43 starters, 22 were classified as finishers and 2 completed insufficient laps to be classified. The above table does not show all starters.

References

Further reading
 Sandown 250, Australian Competition Yearbook, 1973 Edition, pages 156-157
 Barry Lake, Battle Royal, Australian Motor Racing Annual 1973, pages 28 to 35

External links
 Images for "Sandown 1972", autopics.com.au

Motorsport at Sandown
Pre-Bathurst 500